Pitera is a surname. Notable people with the surname include:

 Julia Pitera (born 1953), Polish politician
 Nick Pitera (born 1986), American singer
 Thomas Pitera (born 1954), American mobster

See also